McMaster University has graduated 35 Olympic athletes, and produced eight Olympic coaches, two Olympic
administrators and two Olympic officials.

McMaster Olympic athletes

  C.J. Sylvannus "Syl" Apps '36 (Athletics 1936 - Berlin)
  Grey McLeish '37 (Rowing 1936 - Berlin)
  Betty (Taylor) Campbell '37 (Athletics 1932 - Los Angeles, 1936 - Berlin)
  Catherine (Miller) Ray '38 Athletics 1940 - Tokyo / Helsinki - cancelled due to World War II)
  James Donald McFarlane '53 (Athletics 1952 - Helsinki)
  Barry Ager '62 (Basketball - Summer Olympics 1960 - Rome)
  Dr. Jack Gauldie '64 (Waterpolo 1972 - Munich)
  Sara (Barber) Jenkins '64 (Swimming 1956 - Melbourne, 1960 - Rome)
  Fred Heese '65 (Canoe 1964 - Tokyo)
 Tony Powell '67 (Athletics 1972 - Munich)
 Marjorie Homer-Dixon '73 (Kayak 1968 - Mexico City, 1972 - Munich)
 Steven Mitruk '73 (Gymnastics 1968 - Mexico City, 1972 - Munich)
 David Hart '74 (Waterpolo 1972 - Munich, 1976 - Montreal)
 Rick Puglise '74 (Waterpolo 1972 - Munich, 1976 - Montreal)
 Carol Love '75 (Rowing 1976 - Montreal)
 George Steplock '76 (Waterpolo - 1972 Munich, 1976 Montreal)
 Paul Pottier '79 (Waterpolo 1976 - Montreal, 1984 Los Angeles)
 Craig Martin '82 (Football (Soccer) - 1984 - Los Angeles)
 Paula Schnurr '87 (Athletics 1992 Barcelona, 1996 - Atlanta)
 Paul Ragusa '97 (Wrestling 1996 - Atlanta)
 Larry Cain '89 (Canoe 1988 - Los Angeles, 1988 - Seoul, 1992 - Barcelona)
 Andrea (Page) Steen '89 (Athletics 1984 - Los Angeles)
 Bill Trayling '89 (Canoe 1988 - Seoul - alternate)
 Christopher Woodcroft '89 (Wrestling 1988 - Seoul, 1992 - Barcelona)
 Calum McNeil '91 (Wrestling - 1992 Barcelona - Competed for the United Kingdom)
 Mark Heese '92 (Beach Volleyball 1996 - Atlanta, 2000 - Sydney, 2004 - Athens)
 Lawrence Holmes '92 (Wrestling 1984 - Los Angeles, 1988 - Seoul)
 Susan Palmer-Komar '92 (Cycling 1996 - Atlanta, 2004 - Athens)
 Greg Woodcroft '93 (Wrestling 1996 - Atlanta)
 Tim Bethune '95 (Athletics 1984 - Los Angeles)
 Gavin Maxwell '95 (Canoe 1996 - Atlanta)
 Alan Nolet '96 (Gymnastics 1988- Seoul, 1992 - Barcelona, 1996 - Atlanta)
 Janet Cook '02 (Swimming 2000 - Sydney - alternate)
 Howard Dell '02 (Bobsleigh 1988 - Calgary)
 Joanne Malar '02 (Swimming 1992 - Barcelona, 1996 - Atlanta, 2000 - Sydney)
 Adam van Koeverden '07 (Kayak 2004 - Athens, 2008 - Beijing)
 Chelsey Gotell '09 (Swimming 2004 - Athens, 2008 - Beijing, Paralympics)

Note: Dr. Norman Lane, a McMaster Professor of Mathematics, competed in two Olympic Games (Canoe 1948 - London, 1952 - Helsinki).

Coaches

 Fred Wach (Fencing - unknown)
 Nick Cipriano (Wrestling - 1988 Seoul, 1992 Barcelona, 1996 Atlanta)
 Dave O'Donnell (Fencing - 1988 - Seoul)
 Claus Wolter '80 (Rowing - 1988- Seoul)
 Andrew Cole (Swimming - 1996 - Atlanta, 2000 - Sydney)
 Gaye Stratten (Swimming 1996 - Atlanta)
 Barry Shepley '86 (Triathlon - 2000 Sydney)
 Margot (Verlaan) Page '87 (Hockey - 2006 Turino)

Administrators

 Doug Howard (Wrestling - Manager - 1976 - Montreal)
 Martha (Arnott) Deacon '81 (Badminton - Team Leader - 2000 - Sydney)
 Frank Corning 65' (Wrestling - Manager Olympics, Los Angeles - 1984, Barcelona - 1992, Atlanta - 1996)

Officials

 Dr. Ron Foxcroft '01 (Basketball - 1976 - Montreal)
 Janice Deakin '83 (Basketball - 1996 - Atlanta)

Olympic athletes, coaches and officials
Lists of Olympic competitors by university
Lists of Olympic competitors for Canada